Balidih Industrial Area is an industrial hub in Bokaro Steel City, Jharkhand, India. There are total 300  industries in this area. It is planned to set up an IT Park here by Software Technology Parks of India. The area received a second position for external infrastructure, connectivity and environment safety in Industrial Park Rating System (IPRS) 2017-18 report

Controversy 
Bokaro Industrial Area Development Authority found 27 entrepreneurs who were either not using the land or using it for purposes other than setting up the manufacturing units which was against the rules. The allocations of such 27 plots was eventually cancelled

Companies 

 Jaypee Cements

References 

Industrial parks in India